Pymatuning State Park is a 3512 acres (14.21 km2) Ohio state park near Andover, Ashtabula County, Ohio in the United States. Pymatuning State Park contains 1,407 acres (5.69 km2) of Pymatuning Lake, one-quarter of which is in Ohio and three-quarters of which is in Pennsylvania. The lake provides fishing and boating year round.

Formed in the 1930s by a dam on the Shenango River, the lake features multiple beaches and camping areas in both states. The northeastern part of Pymatuning Lake, east of the spillway and three miles (5 km) south of Linesville, is a protected gameland where colonies of 20,000 Canada geese and many more ducks winter each year. The lake is the result of an earth dam three miles (5 km) north of Jamestown, Pennsylvania, whose outflow forms the Shenango River. A three-mile (5 km) causeway extends between Pennsylvania and Ohio near the center of the lake.

History

Native Americans
Pymatuning State Park is on land that was once a very large swamp. The first known inhabitants were the Mound builders. Two of their mounds were flooded over by the creation of Pymatuning Lake. The Lenape were living in the area when European settlers first came to the area. The lake is named for the chief, who lived in the area at the time, Pihmtomink. The Lenape were pushed out of the area by the Seneca tribe a member of the larger Iroquois Confederacy. The Seneca were defeated by General Anthony Wayne's forces during the Northwest Indian War and left the area under the terms of the Treaty of Greenville. This treaty marked the beginning of the white man's domination of the area.

From swamplands to parklands
The earliest European visitors were trappers trading in beaver pelts, and lumbermen harvesting white pine trunks used as masts for sailing ships. After them came farmers, even though the land was very swampy and very difficult to reclaim. Farm animals that wandered off were often lost in the quicksands of the swamp or fell prey to predators like foxes, bears and mountain lions. The swamps were infested with mosquitoes that brought yellow fever to the settlers.

Building a dam on the Shenango River was first explored in 1911. A massive flood in 1913 caused $3 million in damage and took several lives. The Pennsylvania General Assembly approved a budget of $1.2 million to build a dam across the Shenango, but Governor John K. Tener slashed the budget to $100,000. The legislature took action again in 1917, approving a $400,000 budget under the condition that the needed land in Ohio be purchased by the private sector. The Pymatuning Land Company was formed and raised the needed funds to purchase the needed Ohio properties. The land was finally acquired in full by 1931 when Governor Gifford Pinchot approved $1.5 million to complete the dam. 7,000 men began work on the dam in 1931 and the project was completed in 1934.

References

External links

Pymatuning State Park Ohio Department of Natural Resources 
Pymatuning State Park Map Ohio Department of Natural Resources

State parks of Ohio
Protected areas of Ashtabula County, Ohio
Protected areas established in 1950
Nature centers in Ohio
1950 establishments in Ohio